Not to be confused with the Colonnade Hotel (Seattle) in Washington

The Colonnade Hotel (previously known as The Esplanade hotel) is a 4-star London hotel with 43 rooms, of which three are suites. The hotel is located opposite Warwick Avenue Underground station and Little Venice.

History

The hotel started life as two private Victorian residences in 1865 before being turned into a boarding school in 1880. In 1886, it became the Warrington Lodge Medical and Surgery Home for Ladies.

The mathematician Alan Turing was born there in 1912. In 1935 the hospital was converted into The Esplanade Hotel.

Sigmund Freud stayed at the hotel during the summer of 1938 when he was renovating his house in Hampstead. To honour his stay the hotel renamed the best suite the "Sigmund Freud suite".

In 1944, the hotel was bought by the Cardenas family and its name was changed to the Colonnade Hotel. The hotel changed hands again in 1998 when it was purchased and renovated by the current owners, The Eton Collection.

Location
The hotel's postcode is W9 1ER. The nearest London Underground station is Warwick Avenue on the Bakerloo line.

Awards

 Conde Nast Johanssens Award for Excellence 2002 – Most Excellent London Hotel
 Best Loved Hotels of the World – designated a Best Loved Hotel 2004

References

External links

 Colonnade Hotel website

1935 establishments in England
Hotels established in 1935
Residential buildings completed in 1865
Hotels in the City of Westminster
Grade II listed buildings in the City of Westminster
Grade II listed hotels
Alan Turing